The 2015 World Rugby Under 20 Trophy was the eighth annual international rugby union competition for Under 20 national teams, second-tier world championship. A total of 8 nations played in the tournament.

The event was held in Portugal and was organized by rugby's governing body, World Rugby.

Venues 
The championship was held in Lisbon.

Teams

Pool Stage

Pool A 

{| class="wikitable" style="text-align: center;"
|-
!width="200"|Team
!width="25"|Pld
!width="25"|W
!width="25"|D
!width="25"|L
!width="35"|PF
!width="35"|PA
!width="35"|PD
!width="25"|TF
!width="25"|TA
!width="25"|Pts
|-
|align=left| 
| 3||3||0||0||95||36||+59||13||4||13
|-
|align=left| 
| 3||2||0||1||77||98||-21||10||15||10
|-
|align=left| 
| 3||1||0||2||73||77||-4||10||7||7
|-
|align=left| 
| 3||0||0||3||56||90||-34||5||12||0
|}

Fixtures

Pool B 
{| class="wikitable" style="text-align: center;"
|-
!width="200"|Team
!width="25"|Pld
!width="25"|W
!width="25"|D
!width="25"|L
!width="35"|PF
!width="35"|PA
!width="35"|PD
!width="25"|TF
!width="25"|TA
!width="25"|Pts
|-
|align=left| 
| 3||3||0||0||72||46||+26||8||6||13
|-
|align=left| 
| 3||2||0||1||91||40||+51||13||4||11
|-
|align=left| 
| 3||1||0||2||67||92||-25||10||14||5
|-
|align=left| 
| 3||0||0||3||43||95||-52||5||12||0
|-
|}

Fixtures

Placement matches

7th place game

5th place game

Third place game

Final

References 

2015
2015 rugby union tournaments for national teams
rugby union
International rugby union competitions hosted by Portugal
rugby union
rugby union
rugby union
rugby union